Duchesne Academy of the Sacred Heart, located at 3601 Burt Street in the Midtown area of Omaha, Nebraska, United States, is a Catholic, college-preparatory high school for girls run by the Religious of the Sacred Heart. The institution previously included a college which was operated from 1908 to 1968. Today Duchesne is home to the high school and a co-ed preschool.  While it is located within the Roman Catholic Archdiocese of Omaha, it is an independent institution.

History
Duchesne Academy was established in Omaha in 1881 and is named in honor of St. Rose Philippine Duchesne, one of the first women to join the Society of the Sacred Heart. St. Rose Philippine came to the United States from France in the early 19th century and established the first Sacred Heart school in St. Charles, Missouri. Duchesne is one of 24 schools in the Sacred Heart Network in the United States.

Duchesne enrolls approximately 85 students in each class, for a total of 340 in the school.

Duchesne has developed a nationally prominent mock trial program, winning the national championship in 2015 in the National High School Mock Trial Championship, held in Raleigh, North Carolina.

Traditions
Duchesne celebrates several traditions that are common to all Sacred Heart schools. Each grade has its particular celebration. Freshmen hold a Teacher Recognition Ceremony, while sophomores celebrate Mater, where they recognize women who are models of the Virgin Mary in their lives. During Ring Ceremony, the senior class bestows class rings upon the juniors as a symbolic transfer of school leadership. In May, the seniors graduate at a ceremony at Saint Cecilia's Cathedral. At the end of the year, Prize Day and Honors Day recognize students for academic excellence and leadership, extracurricular activities, athletic accomplishments, and other non-academic awards, respectively.

References

External links
Sacred Heart Education - United States & Canada
Duchesne Academy of the Sacred Heart
Duchesne Preschool 

Girls' schools in Nebraska
History of Omaha, Nebraska
Catholic secondary schools in Nebraska
High schools in Omaha, Nebraska
Sacred Heart schools in the United States
Roman Catholic Archdiocese of Omaha
Educational institutions established in 1881
1881 establishments in Nebraska